Euproctis insulata is a moth in the family Erebidae first described by Alfred Ernest Wileman in 1910. It is found in Taiwan.

The wingspan is 38–50 mm.

References

Moths described in 1910
Lymantriinae